Opened in 2007, the El Mek Nimr Bridge links the downtown area of Khartoum, Sudan with the adjacent city of Khartoum North across the Blue Nile river. It is named after Mek Nimr, a leader of the Ja'alin tribe in northern Sudan, who was famously defeated against the Egyptians.

External links 
 Structurae: El Mek Nimr Bridge
Sudan Online (archived) - Sudan Online

Bridges in Sudan
Bridges over the Nile
Buildings and structures in Khartoum
Khartoum North